Dale Widolff is a former American football coach. He served as the head football coach at Occidental College in Los Angeles from 1982 to 2011, compiling a record of 178–101–2 and leading the Occidental Tigers to 11 Southern California Intercollegiate Athletic Conference (SCIAC) championships. Widolff was fired after 30 years as head coach following an investigation by the National Collegiate Athletic Association (NCAA) into recruiting at Occidental.

Head coaching record

Notes

References

External links
 Chapman profile
 St. Scholastica profile
 Occidental profile

Year of birth missing (living people)
Living people
American football linebackers
Cal Lutheran Kingsmen football coaches
Chapman Panthers football coaches
Indianapolis Greyhounds football players
Occidental Tigers football coaches
Lewis & Clark Pioneers football coaches
St. Scholastica Saints football coaches